Vancouver Rape Relief & Women's Shelter is Canada's longest running rape crisis center. The shelter, located in Vancouver, British Columbia, was established in 1973 and has operated a feminist transition house since 1983, offering women shelter from men who are abusing them, including fathers, husbands, sons, pimps, johns and landlords. A member of the Canadian Association of Sexual Assault Centres (CASAC), it is an independent, non-governmental group with no connection to the criminal justice system.

Services
The group operates a 24-hour, confidential, free-of-charge crisis hotline for abused women. More broadly, it works to eradicate all violence against women, which it defines as including "sexual assault, wife assault, incest, prostitution, and sexual harassment". According to its website, this mission is accomplished by not only providing housing, education, resources, and support for women, but also by participating in global political struggles around issues of race, class, colonialism, and imperialism.

Vancouver Rape Relief and Women's Shelter consists of 27 collective members who work at the shelter, ten of whom are staff. They are committed to having their membership represent Vancouver population and therefore have a third of women identifying as lesbian women, a third are working class women, and almost half of them identify as women of colour. Vancouver Rape Relief and Women's Shelter have stated publicly that their collective members are themselves survivors of male violence against women, ex-callers calling the line, ex-residents who lived at the shelter, and survivors of prostitution.

Budget 
The shelter has a total annual budget of around  $1.1million per year, of which approximately $600,000 is funded by the government of British Columbia.

In March 2019, the Vancouver City Council announced that it would stop awarding an annual $34,312 grant to the organisation and would not award future funding unless the organisation extended accommodations to transgender women. Vancouver councillor Christine Boyle commented, "To receive city funding, they need to be serving all women, and that includes trans women". Hilla Kerner of VRR stated that while the staff always makes sure any trans person who asks for their help is safe, "Our core work, our core services and the way we organize, is based on that particular oppression of being born as female. That's why our services are for only for women who are born as female."

Kimberly Nixon v. Vancouver Rape Relief Society

In August 1995 Kimberly Nixon, a trans woman, filed a complaint against the shelter with the British Columbia Human Rights Tribunal after being turned down for a place on its training programme for volunteer counselors. Nixon argued that this constituted illegal discrimination under Section 41 of the British Columbia Human Rights Code. Vancouver Rape Relief countered that individuals are shaped by the socialization and experiences of their formative years, and that, having grown up "experiencing men's privileges", Nixon would not be able to provide effective counseling. The tribunal found in Nixon's favour and issued an award of $7,500.

Vancouver Rape Relief appealed this decision to the Supreme Court of British Columbia. In 2005 the court repealed the tribunal's verdict, ruling that the shelter is a group protected by section 41 of the B.C. Human Rights Code, which offers an exemption to certain types of organization. Nixon appealed that decision to the Supreme Court of Canada, which declined to hear the appeal in February 2007. Vancouver Rape Relief's lawyer, Christine Boyle, applauded the decision, saying that the "right to organize has been confirmed and is under protection of the law". Nixon's attorney, barbara findlay, said she was disappointed with the ruling, but optimistic about the long-term: "Ultimately, what is accessible to all women will be accessible to trans women, too... I think this just shows that achieving equality will take a long time for the transgendered. But there will be other cases."

See also 
 Radical feminism
 Abolition of Prostitution
 Women-only space

Notes

References

External links
Official website

Anti-prostitution feminism
Feminism in British Columbia
Non-profit organizations based in Vancouver
Radical feminism
Violence against women in Canada
Women-only spaces
Women's organizations based in Canada
Women's shelters in Canada
Women in Vancouver